Kanapur is a village in Mahbubnagar district of Telangana, India. It is located 8 kilometers from Amangal.

References

Villages in Mahbubnagar district